Radegast is a small town in Germany.

Radegast may also refer to:

 Radegast (god), a Slavic god
 Radegast (medieval settlement), also known as Radgosc or Rethra, an ancient Slavic town in Mecklenburg
 Radegast (beer), a Czech beer
 Radegast (Stepenitz), a river of Mecklenburg-Vorpommern, Germany
 Radegast station, a former train station which has been transformed into a Holocaust memorial, located in the Polish city of Łódź

See also 
 Radgosc a historical Lutician city
 Radagast, a fictional character in The Hobbit and The Lord of the Rings
 Radagaisus, a Gothic king, sometimes spelled Rhadagast
 Radhošť (disambiguation)